Matangi is an islet of the Fakaofo island group of Tokelau.

References
Map of Fakaofo Atoll

Islands of Tokelau
Pacific islands claimed under the Guano Islands Act
Fakaofo